Nsé Ufot is an activist, community organizer, and the chief executive officer of the New Georgia Project, a voter support and legal action nonprofit organization founded by Stacey Abrams in 2013. Ufot's organizing efforts in the Georgia 2020 United States presidential election and the 2021 run-off election contributed to turning the state blue. In 2021, she was named one of Time's 100 Next, nominated by Ai-jen Poo.

Early life and education 
Ufot was born in Nigeria and was raised in Southwest Atlanta, Georgia. Ufot cites her experience as a naturalized American citizen as a driver for her commitment to ensuring voting rights. When she was 14, she served as a page for the Georgia House of Representatives. She attended the Georgia Institute of Technology for her undergraduate studies, where she received a Bachelor of Science degree in psychology in 2002. She then attended the University of Dayton School of Law, where she received her Juris Doctor degree.

Career 
Ufot began her career as a corporate lawyer before becoming a labor rights lobbyist and advocate. She was the assistant executive director of the Canadian Association of University Teachers, Canada's largest faculty union, and later served as the Senior Lobbyist and Government Relations Officer for the American Association of University Professors.

She then became the CEO of the New Georgia Project, a nonpartisan, non-profit organization founded by Stacey Abrams to educate and register voters of color in Georgia, and its associated action fund, which supports reforms to increase the civic participation of communities of color. Prior to the 2020 United States presidential election, the New Georgia Project registered over 500,000 Georgians to vote. In the lead-up to the January 2021 Congressional run-off election, Ufot organized volunteers to knock on over two million doors in Georgia, registering nearly 7,000 people in the 30 days following the November general election.

Award and honors 
 40 Under 40, Georgia Tech Alumni Association, 2020
Time 100 Next, 2021

References 

Georgia Tech alumni
University of Dayton alumni
American civil rights activists
Activists from Georgia (U.S. state)
Living people
Year of birth missing (living people)
Women civil rights activists
Nigerian emigrants to the United States